In mathematics, especially in representation theory and algebraic geometry, the Beilinson–Bernstein localization theorem relates D-modules on flag varieties G/B to representations of the Lie algebra  attached to a reductive group G. It was introduced by .

References

 
 
 

Representation theory
Lie algebras
Algebraic geometry